The Pharaonic Tayma inscription is a hieroglyphic petroglyph found near the oasis of Tayma in Tabuk Region, Saudi Arabia. It was discovered by local archaeologists in 2010. The rock engraving was found around 400 km north of Madinah and northeast of the ancient Nabatean site of Madain Saleh. It marks the first confirmed hieroglyphic epigraph discovered in the Kingdom.

According to the SCTA Vice President for Antiquities and Museums Ali Ibrahim Al-Ghabban, the petroglyph contains an inscription belonging to the 20th Dynasty Pharaoh Ramses III (r.1192 BC to 1160 BC).

References

External links
First Pharaonic-era inscription found in Saudi Arabia
Pharaonic Inscription Found in Saudi Arabia

Archaeological discoveries in Saudi Arabia
Arabian Peninsula
Ancient Egypt
2010 archaeological discoveries
Inscriptions